is a university hospital in Japan. It's located in Abeno-ku, Osaka, and affiliated with Osaka Metropolitan University.

History 
The hospital's predecessor was founded in 1925, as the municipal hospital for the city of Osaka, located in Abeno-ku, Osaka due to donation from Kichiemon Kichimoto. Its name was changed as the south municipal hospital for the city of Osaka:.

In 1944, Osaka Municipal Medical school was founded and the hospital was affiliated with the school.

In 1948, Osaka Medical College was founded and the hospital was affiliated with the college.

In 1955, the college was united to Osaka City University, and it affiliated with the university.

In 1993, a new hospital building was completed.

In 2022, the hospital name was changed from "Osaka City University Hospital" to "Osaka Metropolitan University Hospital".

Medical Department 
Osaka City University Hospital has 32 medical departments  including:

 General Medical Center
 Cardiovascular Medicine
 Respiratory Medicine
 Clinical Immunology and Rheumatology
 Diabetes Center
 Nephrology
 Endocrinology
 Gastroenterology
 Internal Medicine; Hepato-Biliary-Pancreatic Diseases
 Hematology and Hematopoietic Cell Transplantation
 Neurology
 Department of Infectious Diseases
 Orthopedic Surgery
 Gastroenterological Surgery
 Breast and Endocrine Surgery
 Department of Hepato-Biliary-Pancreatic Surgery
 Cardiovascular Surgery
 Thoracic Surgery
 Pediatric Surgery

 Neurosurgery
 Plastic & Reconstructive Surgery
 Pediatrics & Neonatology
 Neuropsychiatry
 Urology (Kidney Transplantation)
 Obstetrics & Gynecology, Women's Lifecare Medicine
 Nuclear Medicine
 Anesthesiology and Pain Clinic
 Dermatology
 Diagnostic and Interventional Radiology
 Radiation Oncology
 Ophthalmology
 Otolaryngology, Head and Neck Surgery
 Oral and Maxillofacial Surgery
 Rehabilitation Medicine
 Department of Pathology
 Clinical Laboratory
 Department of Clinical Genomics

MedCity21
MedCity21 is a branch clinic located on the 21st floor of Abeno Harukas. This clinic was opened in 2014 as the first clinic operated by public university in Japan. It provides physical examination, general medicine, and medical check for pregnant women, and also collects medical data with patients' consent.

Access 
According to a travel site, access to Osaka City University Hospital is below

5 minutes walk from Tennōji Station
 7 minutes walk from Tennōji Ekimae Station
 9 minutes walk from Dōbutsuen-mae Station

See also 

 Osaka Metropolitan University

External links 

 大阪公立大学医学部附属病院
 Osaka Metropolitan University Hospital

References 

Hospital buildings completed in 1993
Hospitals in Osaka
Hospitals established in 1925
Teaching hospitals in Japan
1925 establishments in Japan